Pokrovskoye is a rural locality (a selo) in Pokrovskoye Rural Settlement, Chagodoshchensky District, Vologda Oblast, Russia. The population was 415 as of 2002. There are 8 streets.

Geography 
Gora is the nearest rural locality.

References 

Rural localities in Chagodoshchensky District